Domaine Roulot is a winery in Meursault, Côte de Beaune, Burgundy.

The domaine was founded in 1830 by Guillaume Roulot, and has  of vineyards. Since 1988, it is led by Jean-Marc Roulot, who produces organic wine since 1989.

The 1973 vintage of Roulot's white premier cru wine Meursault Charmes was ranked second in the historic Judgment of Paris wine competition. Meursault Charmes Roulot also featured in the Great Chardonnay Showdown in 1980.

References 

Burgundy (historical region) wine producers